Lockwood & Co. is a young adult supernatural thriller series written by Jonathan Stroud. The series follows three young operatives of a psychic detection agency (Lucy Carlyle, Anthony Lockwood, and George Cubbins) as they fight ghosts (known throughout the series as Visitors) in London, England.

The series consists of five books: The Screaming Staircase, The Whispering Skull, The Hollow Boy, The Creeping Shadow, and The Empty Grave, published from 2013 to 2017.

Supplementary work
A short story was released over six days in late October 2013 on The Guardians website. It was written by Stroud, with input from readers to decide on the location, the type of ghost, and its title, which became The Dagger in the Desk.

Reception

The Screaming Staircase 
The Screaming Staircase has received the following accolades:
 Cybils Award (Speculative Fiction) (2013)
 Goodreads Choice Award (Middle Grade & Children's)(2013)
 Los Angeles Times Book Prize (2014)
 Mystery Writers of America's Edgar Awards (Best Juvenile)(2014)
 Jewish Community Secondary School's WeRead Prize (2014)
 BookTrust and Amazon Kindle's Booktrust Best Book Awards shortlist (9-11 Best Story) (2014)
 North Carolina Young Adult Book Award nominee (2014)
 Carnegie Medal for Literature nominee (2014)
 Worcestershire Public Libraries' Worcestershire Teen Book Award shortlist (2014)
 Silver Inky Award shortlist (2014)
 International Librarians of Japan's Sakura Medal nominee (2015)
 Stratford Girls' Grammar School's Warwickshire Secondary Book Awards (2015)
 Coventry City Council's Coventry Inspiration Book Awards shortlist (2015)
 UKYA Blogger Awards' UKYA Blogger Awards nominee (2015)
 The Weald School's Weald Book Award shortlist (2015)
 American Library Association's Popular Paperbacks for Young Adults (2015)
 Children's Literature Association of Utah Beehive Book Awards nominee (Young Adult Fiction) (2016)
 Nevada Library Association's Nevada Young Readers' Award (Intermediate) (2016)
 Washington Library Association's Sasquatch Award nominee (2016)
 Rebecca Caudill Young Readers' Book Award nominee (2017)

The Whispering Skull 
The Whispering Skull has received the following accolades:
 Kirkus starred review (2014)
 Booklist starred review (2014)
 Goodreads Choice Award (Middle Grade & Children's) nominee (2014)
 American Library Association's Amazing Audiobooks for Young Adults (2015)

The Hollow Boy 
The Hollow Boy has received the following accolades:
 Goodreads Choice Award (Middle Grade & Children's) nominee (2015)
 Booklist starred review (2016)

The Creeping Shadow 
The Creeping Shadow has received the following accolades:
 Goodreads Choice Award nominee (Middle Grade & Children's) (2015)
 Booklist starred review (2016)

The Empty Grave 
The Empty Grave has received the following accolades:
 Booklist starred review (2017)
 Booklist Editor's Choice Books for Youth (2017)
 Goodreads Choice Awards (Middle Grade & Children's)(2017)
 Carnegie Medal nominee (2019)

TV series

In September 2017, it was announced that Big Talk Productions had optioned the rights to Lockwood & Co., with plans to adapt it into a television series. In December 2020, the show was announced to be going to Netflix, adapted by Joe Cornish. Filming began on the series in the week following 5 July 2021. The series premiered on 27 January 2023, consisting of eight episodes.

References 

Young adult novel series
Book series introduced in 2013
British novels adapted into television shows